Hackenberg may refer to:
People
 Christian Hackenberg (born 1995), American football quarterback
 David Hackenberg, American beekeeper and early witness to Colony Collapse Disorder
 Jacob Hackenburg Griffiths-Randolph (1914–1986), judge and politician in Ghana
 Peter Hackenberg (born 1989), German professional footballer
Places
Hackenberg (Vienna), suburb of Vienna, Austria
Ouvrage Hackenberg, fortification near Veckring, a French commune
See also
Hachenburg, German town
Giovanni Narcis Hakkenberg (1923–2013), Dutch marine
Hankenberge, former German municipality, now part of Hilter

German toponymic surnames